Niphoparmena minima is a species of beetle in the family Cerambycidae. It was described by Stephan von Breuning in 1939.

It's 4½–5⅔ mm long and 1⅓–1⅔ mm wide, and its type locality is Mount Kinangop.

References

minima
Beetles described in 1939
Taxa named by Stephan von Breuning (entomologist)